is a Japanese TV miniseries which screened in eight parts between 31 January and 20 March 1972. It was directed by Masaki Kobayashi and based on a novel by Yasushi Inoue. The series received the same year's Nippon Television Technology Award for photography.

A re-edited version was released theatrically in 1975. The theatrical version was Japan's submission to the 47th Academy Awards for the Academy Award for Best International Feature Film, but was not accepted as a nominee.

Plot
Tokyo business tycoon Tajihei Kazuki is given a diagnosis of terminal cancer and must now re-assess his life and values.

Cast
 Shin Saburi as Tajihei Kazuki
 Mayumi Ogawa as Akiko Kazuki
 Keiko Kishi as Woman (Death)
 Komaki Kurihara as Kiyoko Kazuki
 Haruko Sugimura as Mother-in-law
 Hisashi Igawa as Funazu

See also
 List of submissions to the 47th Academy Awards for Best Foreign Language Film
 List of Japanese submissions for the Academy Award for Best Foreign Language Film

References

External links
 
 
 

1972 films
1972 drama films
Japanese drama television series
Films directed by Masaki Kobayashi
Films scored by Toru Takemitsu
1970s Japanese films